Piotrkowianin Piotrków Trybunalski is a men's handball club from Piotrków Trybunalski, Poland, that plays in the Superliga.

History 
Historical names:
Concordia Piotrków Trybunalski (1997–2004)
Piotrkowianin Piotrków Trybunalski (2004–)

Team

Current squad
Squad for the 2022–23 season

Goalkeepers
1  Kacper Ligarzewski
 12  Damian Chmurski
 24  Artur Kot

Left wingers
 14  Piotr Swat
 55  Patryk Mastalerz
 66  Krystian Krajewski
Right wingers
9  Marcin Matyjasik
 11  Marcin Szopa
Line players
6  Antoni Doniecki
 21  Marcel Filipowicz
 32  Roman Požárek
 90  Adam Pacześny

Left backs
 23  Filip Surosz
 44  Paweł Kowalski
Centre backs
4  Tomasz Wawrzyniak
5  Piotr Jędraszczyk
 33  Kamil Mosiołek
Right backs
8  Jan Stolarski
 13  Eryk Pstrąg

Transfers
Transfers for the 2022–23 season

 Joining
  Krystian Krajewski (LW) (from  UKS MSMS Victoria Łódź)
  Paweł Kowalski (LB) (from  Gwardia Opole)
  Eryk Pstrąg (RB) (from  SMS Kwidzyn)
  Marcel Filipowicz (P) (from  SMS Kwidzyn)

 Leaving
  Adam Babicz (LB) (to  Stal Mielec)
  Kamil Sadowski (RB) (to  Stal Mielec) ?

Transfers for the 2023–24 season

 Joining

 Leaving
  Piotr Jędraszczyk (CB) (to  Industria Kielce)

See also 
 Handball in Poland
 Sports in Poland

References

External links
 Official website 

Polish handball clubs
Sport in Łódź Voivodeship
Handball clubs established in 1997
1997 establishments in Poland
Piotrków Trybunalski